Alicia Molik and Barbara Schett were the defending champions, but none competed this year. Schett retired from professional tennis during this season.

Émilie Loit and Katarina Srebotnik won the title by defeating Eva Birnerová and Mara Santangelo 6–4, 6–3 in the final.

Seeds

Draw

Draw

References
 ITF tournament profile

Doubles
Nordea Nordic Light Open
Nordic